Aleksandr Aleksandrovich Serebrov (15 February 1944 – 12 November 2013) was a Soviet cosmonaut. He graduated from Moscow Institute of Physics and Technology (1967), and was selected as a cosmonaut on 1 December 1978. He retired on 10 May 1995. He was married and had one child.

Serebrov flew on Soyuz T-7, Soyuz T-8, Soyuz TM-8, and Soyuz TM-17. He was one of very few cosmonauts to fly for both the Soviet Union and the Russian Federation that followed it. He held the record for most spacewalks, 10, until Anatoly Solovyev surpassed it. In all, he spent 371.95 days in space. Serebrov contributed to the design of Salyut 6, Salyut 7, and the Mir space stations. He helped design, and, according to a New York Times obituary, "was the first to test a one-person vehicle - popularly called a space motorcycle - to rescue space crews in distress and repair satellites." This vehicle, known as Icarus, was tested in February 1990, and remained onboard Mir for several years but was never used after that.

Serebrov died suddenly in Moscow on 12 November 2013, aged 69, and was buried on November 15 at Ostankinsky cemetery.

He is also known for playing Tetris on a Game Boy in the spacecraft, making it the first time a video game has ever been played in space.

Awards and honors 

 Title of Hero of the Soviet Union
 Title of Pilot-Cosmonaut of the USSR
 Order of Friendship of Peoples 
 Two Orders of Lenin
 Order of the October Revolution
 Medal "For Merit in Space Exploration" (Russian Federation)
 Officer of the Legion of Honour (France)

Asteroid 365375 Serebrov, discovered by Timur Kryachko in 2009, was named in his memory. The official  was published by the Minor Planet Center on 8 November 2019.

References 
 

Soviet cosmonauts
Moscow Institute of Physics and Technology alumni
Heroes of the Soviet Union
1944 births
2013 deaths
Cosmonauts from Moscow
Recipients of the Order of Friendship of Peoples
Recipients of the Order of Lenin
Recipients of the Medal "For Merit in Space Exploration"
Officiers of the Légion d'honneur
Salyut program cosmonauts
Spacewalkers
Mir crew members